Sergei Olegovich Zinovjev (born March 4, 1980) is a Russian former professional ice hockey centre and General Manager of his original club, Metallurg Novokuznetsk of the Kontinental Hockey League (KHL). He is two-time World Champion (2008, 2009) for the Russian national team.

Zinovjev was selected 73rd overall by the Boston Bruins in the 2000 NHL Entry Draft. Zinovjev has played ten career NHL games, scoring one assist. In 2004, Zinovjev was released from the Russian national team after testing positive for marijuana. In July 2009, he signed a five-year contract in a return with Salavat Yulaev Ufa. He concluded his 16-year professional career following the 2013–14 season.

Career statistics

Regular season and playoffs

International

Awards & honors
2000 Junior World Silver medal: Russian national team
2004 Russia Championship Bronze medal: Ak Bars Kazan
2005 World Championship Bronze medal: Russian national team
2006 RSL Champion: Ak Bars Kazan
2007 European Champions Cup Winner: Ak Bars Kazan
2007 World Championship Bronze medal: Russian national team
2007–08 Continental Cup Winner: Ak Bars Kazan
2008 World Champion: Russia national team
2008 Spengler Cup Winner: Dynamo Moscow
2009 KHL All-Star
2009 World Champion: Russia national team
2011 Gagarin Cup Champion: Salavat Yulaev Ufa

External links

1980 births
Living people
Ak Bars Kazan players
Boston Bruins draft picks
Boston Bruins players
HC Dynamo Moscow players
Metallurg Novokuznetsk players
HC Spartak Moscow players
Ice hockey players at the 2010 Winter Olympics
Lokomotiv Yaroslavl players
Olympic ice hockey players of Russia
People from Prokopyevsk
Providence Bruins players
Russian ice hockey centres
Salavat Yulaev Ufa players
Sportspeople from Kemerovo Oblast